Orcinus paleorca is a fossil species of Orcinus, the genus of killer whales (orca), dated to the Middle Pleistocene. The only known specimen is a tooth fragment discovered in Honshu, Japan.

Taxonomy
The holotype specimen, a tooth fragment, was found by G. Natsume in the Sanuki Formation in the Kazusa Province of Honshu, Japan–an area dating back to the Middle Pleistocene–and described in 1937 by Japanese paleontologist Hikoshichiro Matsumoto. Orcinus paleorca could represent the ancestor of the modern killer whale (Orcinus orca). Matsumoto noted that the teeth of O. paleorca are much larger and have more similar dimensions to the modern killer whale than those of the Pliocene O. citoniensis are.

Description
The tooth is conical and belonged to the upper right or lower left jaw of an adult individual. Like the modern killer whale, the tooth lacks a coat of cementum. However, unlike the modern killer whale, O. paleorca had a circular tooth root has opposed to an oval, and the pulp extended more towards the back than the front.

Paleobiology
Orcinus species, like many other predatory marine lineages, may have fished up the food chain, with the apparently more primitive O. citoniensis able to hunt large fish, and the modern killer whale's ability to hunt large whales.

The Middle Pleistocene deposits indicate a warm temperate climate, and temperate forests of land. The marine mammal diversity comprises O. paleorca, an undetermined species of Orcinus, the baleen whale Mizuhoptera, an unidentified oceanic dolphin, the fossil false killer whale Pseudorca yokoyamai, the fossil walrus Odobenus mandanoensis, an undetermined species of Eumetopias sea lion, and the recently extinct Steller's sea cow (Hydrodamalis gigas). Sharks present were the great white shark (Carcharodon carcharias) and the extinct broad-toothed mako (Cosmopolitodus hastalis).

References

Orcas
Pliocene cetaceans
Pleistocene cetaceans
Pleistocene extinctions
Pliocene first appearances
Fossils of Japan